The 2019 Burnley Borough Council election took place on 2 May 2019 to elect members of Burnley Borough Council in England. This election was held on the same day as other local elections. One third of the council was up for election, and each successful candidate will serve a four-year term of office, expiring in 2023. These seats were last contested in 2015.

In 2017, four members of the local Liberal Democrats (including Charlie Briggs and Mark Payne) left the party over its stance on Brexit, to form the Burnley and Padiham Independent Party. However in early 2019 Christine White (elected in 2016) stepped down following a complaint from a resident, prompting a by-election in the Rosehill with Burnley Wood ward which was won by Peter McCann of the Liberal Democrats. After the 2018 election, Bill and Margaret Brindle (both Coalclough with Deerplay ward) who had been sitting on the council as independents after also splitting with the local Lib Dems, joined the Labour group.

Following the election Labour lost control of the council and a coalition of all the other parties formed a new executive with Charlie Briggs returning to the role of Council leader to replace Mark Townsend.

State of the Parties 
After the election, the composition of the council was:

Election results

Overall election result
Overall result compared with 2018.

Ward results

Bank Hall

Briercliffe ward

Brunshaw ward

Cliviger with Worsthorne ward

Coalclough with Deerplay ward

Daneshouse with Stoneyholme ward

Gannow ward

Gawthorpe ward

Hapton with Park ward

Lanehead ward

Queensgate ward

Rosegrove with Lowerhouse ward

Rosehill with Burnley Wood ward

Trinity ward

Whittlefield with Ightenhill

References

2019 English local elections
2019
2010s in Lancashire
May 2019 events in the United Kingdom